Platydoris inornata is a species of sea slug, a dorid nudibranch, shell-less marine opisthobranch gastropod mollusks in the family Discodorididae.

Distribution
The holotype of this species was collected at the Pinnacle, between Tab Island and Rasch Pass, Madang, New Guinea, . Further specimens from Madang, New Guinea and Sumilon Island and Maricaban Island, Philippines were included in the original description.

References

Discodorididae
Gastropods described in 2002